The Thumb member of the Horse Spring Formation is a geologic formation in Nevada. It contains sandstone with beds of conglomerate and gypsum in the Neogene period.

References

Neogene geology of Nevada